Beverley Anne Holloway (born October 1931) is a New Zealand entomologist. Holloway is a preeminent lucanid systematist and was awarded the New Zealand Commemoration Medal in 1990 for services to New Zealand as a scientist. She has also been elected a Fellow of the Entomological Society of New Zealand.

Biography 
Holloway was born in Lower Hutt in October 1931. She was educated at Stokes Valley School and Wellington Girls' College before completing a Bachelor of Science degree in 1952 at Victoria University College in Wellington. After graduating, Holloway worked as an assistant entomologist at the Dominion Museum. She continued to undertake part-time study at the Victoria until 1954 when she completed a master's degree with first-class honours in zoology.

Holloway was awarded a Fulbright Scholarship in 1955 and as a result spent three years at the Harvard Biological Laboratory. While there she completed a PhD in biology, which was awarded to her in 1959. Upon returning to New Zealand, Holloway was appointed to the position of entomologist at the Dominion Museum. In 1962, Holloway moved to Nelson to join the entomology division of the Department of Scientific and Industrial Research.

In 1963, Holloway married Guillermo Kuschel, a fellow entomologist. From 1963 to 1973, Holloway undertook the full-time parenting of the couple's three children.

In 1974, Holloway was employed to work on diptera at the systematics section of the Department of Scientific and Industrial Research in Auckland. In 1981, she again began researching Coleoptera and in particular researched Anthribidae for a scientific publication. In 1990, Holloway's services to New Zealand as a scientist was recognised when she was awarded the New Zealand Commemoration Medal. Although she retired in 1991, Holloway continues her research. In 2009, she was awarded the Fellowship of the Entomological Society of New Zealand recognising her outstanding contribution to entomology.

Holloway is considered a preeminent lucanid systematist. Many of the specimens she has collected are held at the Museum of New Zealand Te Papa Tongarewa and at the New Zealand Arthropod Collection.

Species named in Holloway's honour
Holloway has several species named in her honour. These are
 Allograpta hollowayae
 Androporus hollowayae
 Austropsocus hollowayae
 Fannia hollowayae
 Kuschelysius hollowayae
 Omanuperla hollowayae
 Perroudius hollowayae
 Plectophanes hollowayae
 Pounamuella hollowayae

References

1931 births
New Zealand entomologists
20th-century New Zealand scientists
Living people
Victoria University of Wellington alumni
Harvard University alumni
People from Lower Hutt
People educated at Wellington Girls' College
People associated with Department of Scientific and Industrial Research (New Zealand)
New Zealand women scientists
Women entomologists
Fellows of the Entomological Society of New Zealand